Oluwakemi Adejoro Ojo , popularly known as Kemi Korede is a Nigerian actress, TV presenter a producer as well as an MC. She is usually seen in Yoruba films. Oluwakemi alongside Toyin Alausa was signed into the Honeyglow skin care in 2021 by the CEO of the brand.

Early life and education 
For tertiary education, she studied nursing.

Career 
Kemi Korede started acting right from secondary school but came into limelight in 2006 starring in the movie, Omobewaji

Filmography 
 Ile Olorogun
 Afi ibi Solore
 Obo Iyi
 Satan’s Bride
 Oju Ade
 Omo Aye
 Omobewaji
 Ignorance
 Wemimo
 Ojoor
 Khafila
 Current Alhaja
 Abo Oja

Personal life 
Kemi is married with three kids.

See also 
 Funke Akindele
 Aderounmu
 Nkechi Blessing Sunday

References 

Yoruba filmmakers
Nigerian film actresses
Yoruba actresses
Nigerian television presenters
Nigerian film producers
Actresses in Yoruba cinema
Nigerian women film producers
21st-century Nigerian actresses
Nigerian television personalities
Year of birth missing (living people)
Living people